RMS Amazon may refer to one of the following Royal Mail Ships of the Royal Mail Steam Packet Company or Royal Mail Lines:

 , an RMSP wooden paddle steamer that burned and sank on her maiden voyage in January 1852, killing 104 people
 , an RML ocean liner transferred to Shaw, Savill Line in 1968 and later converted into the car transporter ship Akarita.

Ship names